The Battle of Depułtycze, one of many clashes of the January Uprising, took place on August 5, 1863, near the village of Depułtycze Królewskie, which at that time belonged to Russian-controlled Congress Poland. A Polish insurgent unit clashed with a detachment of the Imperial Russian Army, which was sent there from Krasnystaw. The battle began at 10:30 a.m., and lasted several hours, ending in Polish victory. The insurgents lost 11 men, while Russian losses were 23 killed.

Sources 
 Stefan Kieniewicz: Powstanie styczniowe. Warszawa: Państwowe Wydawnictwo Naukowe, 1983. .

Conflicts in 1863
1863 in Poland
Depultycze
August 1863 events